György Bence (Budapest, 8 December 1941 – 28 October 2006, Budapest) was a university professor, philosopher, dissident and political consultant.

In 1979 he was among the first Hungarians who criticized together with Andrei Sakharov and others the Soviet crackdown on the Czech Charter 77 signatories.

Later he was among the founding members of the International Helsinki Federation for Human Rights. He was founding editor-in-chief of the Budapesti Könyvszemle (1989–1995).

See also
János Kis

Notes

External links
Metazin list of obituaries 
Review of Bence's collection 

1941 births
2006 deaths
Writers from Budapest
Hungarian Jews
Jewish philosophers
20th-century Hungarian philosophers